The list contains the names of the largest islands of the Bahamas by area.

See also 
List of islands by area
List of islands of the Bahamas
List of cities in the Bahamas
Districts of the Bahamas

References

 
Islands, area
Bahamas
Bahamas